"Hold On, I'm Comin" (officially registered as "Hold On, I'm Coming", and shown on the original single release as "Hold On! I'm Comin and "Hold On! I'm a Comin) is a 1966 single recorded by soul duo Sam & Dave, issued on the Atlantic-distributed Stax label in 1966.

The song was written by the songwriting team of Isaac Hayes and David Porter, who came up with the title of the song spontaneously when Hayes was trying to get Porter to hurry out of the Stax Studios restroom and get back to songwriting. The original title was "Hold On, I'm Comin, but some radio stations objected to its "suggestive nature", and labels on most copies of the single gave the title as "Hold On! I'm A Comin. Released as Stax 189 in the spring of 1966, the single peaked at number one on the Billboard Hot R&B singles chart and at number 21 on the Billboard Hot 100 in the United States.

Following the instrumental introduction, Sam sings the first verse and is joined by Dave for the chorus. Dave sings the second verse and is joined by Sam for the chorus. In the bridge section, Dave sings the first part and Sam sings the second part, which is followed by a brief instrumental passage. Sam sings the third verse and is joined by Dave for the chorus. The introduction is repeated in the chorus, with both Sam and Dave singing until the song fades out.

A revamped version of the song, "Hold On, Edwin's Coming", was recorded by Sam & Dave as a promotional single for Louisiana Governor Edwin Edwards' third election campaign in 1982. Three years later, Dave Prater teamed with new singing partner Sam Daniels as "The New Sam and Dave Review" and recorded "Medley/Hold On, I'm Comin for Atlantic Records.

Personnel
Vocals by Sam Moore and Dave Prater
Instrumentation by Booker T. & the M.G.'s and the Mar-Keys Horns

Cover versions and samples
Maxine Brown and Chuck Jackson recorded a cover in 1967, which reached number 20 on the Billboard R&B chart and number 91 on the Billboard pop chart.
Tom Jones on the 1968 release The Tom Jones Fever Zone.
Dating back to 1967, on the album Glory of Love, flutist Herbie Mann covered the track multiple times, with the most recent release being on the soundtrack of 2021's Summer of Soul. 
Canadian singer Karen Silver released a disco version in 1979, which reached number 15 on the Billboard disco chart.
Aretha Franklin covered the song on her 1981 album Love All the Hurt Away; her version earned her ninth Grammy Award for Best Female R&B Vocal Performance.
Waylon Jennings covered the song with Jerry Reed on his 1983 album, Waylon and Company.
A cover version by The Neville Brothers was featured in the 1995 film Money Train and was also used in trailers for the 1996 film First Kid and the 1999 Pixar film Toy Story 2.
Eric Clapton and B.B. King recorded a blues cover on their album Riding with the King.
Tina Turner covered the song on her 1999 album, limited edition bonus disc Twenty Four Seven.
A cover version by Cynthia Erivo was featured in the 2018 film Bad Times at the El Royale, during the end credits.
Boney M album 1979 Oceans of Fantasy features a guest appearance by Eruption's lead singer Precious Wilson the cover of "Hold On I'm Coming", which was also issued as Wilson's first solo single.

Charts

Weekly charts

Year-end charts

Certifications

See also
List of number-one R&B singles of 1966 (U.S.)

References

External links

1966 songs
1966 singles
Songs written by Isaac Hayes
Songs written by David Porter (musician)
Sam & Dave songs
Soul songs
Checkmates, Ltd. songs
Aretha Franklin songs
Waylon Jennings songs
Jerry Reed songs
Stax Records singles
Atlantic Records singles
RCA Records singles